This is a list of rail accidents in France.

The attack on the Thalys train on 2015 is not listed, since no train accident occurred.

Rail accidents in France

See also 

 List of rail accidents by country
 Lists of rail accidents
 French Land Transport Accident Investigation Bureau (BEA-TT)

References 

France